Joaquín de Iglesias Vidamartel  (1794-1840) was an early nineteenth-century Costa Rican politician.

References

Costa Rican politicians
1794 births
1840 deaths